Agostine Salvatore Lio (April 30, 1918 – September 3, 1989) was an American football offensive lineman in the National Football League for the Detroit Lions, Boston Yanks, and the Philadelphia Eagles.  He also played in the All-America Football Conference for the Baltimore Colts.  He was inducted to the College Football Hall of Fame in 1979.

Lio played high school football at Passaic High School in Passaic, New Jersey.  He then played college football at Georgetown University and was selected as a first-team All-American in 1940 by the Hearst newspapers, the Central Press Association, Collier's Weekly, and the New York Sun.  He was drafted in the fourth round of the 1941 NFL Draft.

After retiring from football in 1947 Lio spent the next 37 years at The Herald & News of Passaic, N.J. as a sports editor, columnist and writer covering the NY Giants.

References

External links

1918 births
1989 deaths
People from East Boston, Boston
American football guards
American football tackles
Baltimore Colts (1947–1950) players
Boston Yanks players
College Football Hall of Fame inductees
Detroit Lions players
Georgetown Hoyas football players
Passaic High School alumni
Sportspeople from Passaic, New Jersey
Philadelphia Eagles players
Sportswriters from Massachusetts
Players of American football from Massachusetts
Players of American football from New Jersey